Andrii Bratashchuk (born 8 April 1992) is a Ukrainian cyclist, who last rode for UCI Continental team . He rode at the 2016 UCI Road World Championships in the road race, but failed to finish.

Major results

2016
 2nd Overall Tour of Małopolska
 National Road Championships
4th Road race
4th Time trial
2017
 National Road Championships
2nd Road race
4th Time trial
 2nd Minsk Cup
 7th Korona Kocich Gór
 9th Odessa Grand Prix
 9th Overall Tour of China II
2018
 1st Stage 3 Tour de Hongrie
 National Road Championships
2nd Road race
4th Time trial

References

External links

1992 births
Living people
Ukrainian male cyclists
Sportspeople from Rivne
21st-century Ukrainian people